Vortex Bladeless Ltd. is a Spanish technology startup company that is developing a type of wind power generator without rotating blades or lubricants, unlike the more common wind turbines. Power is produced from resonant vibrations produced when wind passes the turbine and is deflected into vortices in a process called vortex shedding.

This technology has some traits which are more similar to solar power than to large wind turbines, such as being better suited to autonomous operation and distributed generation of energy off the grid, for and on low-power systems.

Technology 
Vortex Bladeless is a vortex-induced vibration resonant wind generator, in contrast to horizontal-axis wind turbines (HAWT) and vertical-axis wind turbines (VAWT) that work by rotation. Vortex's innovation comes from its unusual shape and way of harnessing energy by oscillation: its fiberglass and carbon fiber reinforced polymer mast oscillates in the wind, taking advantage of the emission of von Kármán vortices when a moving fluid passes over a slender structure. At the bottom of the mast, a carbon fiber rod moves an alternator that generates electricity with no moving parts in contact. Vortex Bladeless does not rotate, and thus is not a turbine.

The design seeks to overcome issues related to rotary wind turbines such as maintenance, amortization, noise, birds and environmental impact, logistics, and visual aspects. According to the firm, Vortex generators have a small carbon footprint and use less raw materials compared to rotary wind turbines of the same height. They are expected to have a low center of gravity that allows for a small foundation dimensions and a very low wake turbulence, so several Vortex generators can fit in the same area as one rotary turbine, possibly improving on the lower energy density per hectare that wind turbines usually achieve. However, the firm does not aim to compete with the wind turbine industry but to offer a small wind turbine alternative for the end-consumer market and for low-power systems, markets served poorly or not at all by larger scale wind power.

Vortex is a vertical, slender, cylindrical device. It is composed of two main parts: a fixed base where the device is attached to an anchor, and a flexible mast which, acting as a cantilever, interacts more freely with moving fluid in an oscillating movement. It has no gears or moving parts in contact, so it needs no oils or lubricants as do rotary machines. The device's operation barely requires maintenance and operating costs. All these features make them closer to solar power's features and make them more useful for distributed energy. A linear alternator transforms mechanical energy into electricity. It counts with neodymium magnets and its stator is located inside of the moving part of the device.

While converting mechanical energy into electricity, the alternator damps (cushions) the induced oscillation movement and simultaneously can modify the natural oscillation frequency of the moving structure. Thus, the lock-in range is increased while maintaining the resonance frequency in higher wind speeds. The firm patented a mechanism called tuning system for this task, based on magnetic repulsion. Unlike rotary wind turbines, this phenomenon can modify the apparent elasticity constant of the structure which depends on the oscillation amplitude, allowing it to grow as long as wind speed grows. Despite its simplicity, 6 families of registered patents protect the design and technology worldwide.

Bladeless wind devices 
Vortex Bladeless is currently working on two future products that are expected to be commercially available in 2021. The specified goals for each model are:
Designed mainly to bring energy to off-grid locations for low-power systems, working along with solar panels. Stage: pre-production of a first beta series.
Designed mainly for small-scale residential and rural autonomous operation, working with solar panels. Stage: prototype, being developed.
Designed for residential and rural autonomous operation and complementary installation with solar panels over buildings and factories. Stage: projected but not being developed yet.

With Vortex technology, the amount of energy harnessed grows exponentially squared by height and cubed by wind speed. Thus, bigger Vortex devices are desirable since production costs grow more slowly than power generation with height, giving as a result more profitable and efficient devices able to work with higher winds. , because of their small and medium-sized enterprises (SME) status, the firm is only working on these small wind turbine alternative devices.

Story and biography 
Vortex Bladeless Ltd. is a wind energy Spanish startup company that was formalised in 2012 by David Yáñez, David Suriol, and Raúl Martín. In 2014, they officially founded the firm as full-time employees. The original idea emerged in 2002 when David Yáñez, the inventor, saw a video of the Tacoma Narrows Bridge (1940) disaster which led him to the idea that there is a lot of energy contained in the physical principle that collapsed the bridge, and it could be harnessed as a new way to generate energy from wind. His idea was kept in a drawer for years until 2012 when they began to look for investors and funding to start the project.

In early 2014, Vortex obtained public funding from the Centre for the Development of Industrial Technology (CDTI) and began to collaborate with Barcelona Supercomputing Center (BSC) and their huge computing resources for the simulations on vortex-induced vibrations (VIV), magnetic field interactions, and finite element method magnetics (FEMM) researches needed for their development. The proof of concept was validated and the story of Vortex began winning the South Summit Award 2014 in the category of Energy and Industry.

In 2015, the firm began collaborating with representatives from the Massachusetts Institute of Technology (MIT) and Harvard University. In the United States, the project reached the company Altair Engineering who offered their advanced simulation software to Vortex for their investigation on their fluid dynamics concept. Also, NGOs and other environmental entities like BirdLife International have shown interest in this system and offered to collaborate, since Vortex may have a lower impact on nature and birds, especially as bigger wind power devices are built in the future. Thanks to the support from these public administration and research centers, in 2015, Vortex launched in June a successful crowdfunding campaign to fund the first supply agreements, and hire engineers needed to advance the project.

In late 2016, and after validating the technology on computer simulations and technology demonstrators, the company reached the prototype stage with a geometry that can harness a useful amount of energy from the wind with this principle. At this stage, Vortex was able to apply for funding from the Horizon 2020 for research and innovation programme of the European Commission. Being the most funding that the company had, Vortex built a big wind tunnel, the tallest in Spain, for testing their systems, and began the development of their patented concept of an oscillating alternator with tuning system. On this phase, the company won the Seal of Excellence of the H2020 programme.

During 2017, the firm kept developing their alternator and tuning system. Since this technology is considered as new in many aspects intervening (geometry, movement, energy conversion system), it has been a harder development than the firm expected. The collaboration on this stage of the Microgravity Institute of the Technical University of Madrid and the European University of Madrid, alongside CDTI, Altair, Birdlife and Barcelona Supercomputing Center (BSC) were the key to obtain a feasible technology that can harness energy from the wind on this particular way. In this year the company obtained the "Innovation SME" seal of the Spanish government.

In 2018, the firm began to plan to industrialize their aerogenerators. At this point, the firm faced many problems due to the lack of feasible industrial production processes to mass-produce some of the pieces that use Vortex technology. The geometry and the materials were almost finalized at this stage, so the firm began a certification process for their current prototypes and obtained the ISO 9001. This certification is a regular process for every wind turbine in the European and American market. The standard is written for bladed and rotary turbines, and may need to be rewritten to certify Vortex devices as wind generators.

The goals of the firm for the future are to obtain the certification needed to start selling, and to set up a feasible method of production and logistics of shipping so they can start commercializing the first Vortex turbines for 2020.

Awards, strategic partners 
Most relevant strategic partners for Vortex Bladeless are the Executive Agency for Small and Medium-sized Enterprises (EASME), the Centre for the Development of Industrial Technology (CDTI), Altair Engineering, and the Council of Castile and León in Spain. The awards won by the company or their team are all related to energy, innovation, and entrepreneurship, listed by date:
 2017 – Innovation SME of the Spanish Government
 2016 – EU's SME instrument Seal of Excellence
 2016 – Renewable of the Year 2016 at 10th From Avila phase of Energy
 2014 – The South Summit Award (category of energy and industry)
 2014 – Engineers Box Entrepreneurs Award
 2012 – Entrepreneurs Fund Repsol Foundation Award

Criticisms 

The Vortex Bladeless Wind Turbine has not received, nor applied for independent review by the Small Wind Certification Council (SWCC). Conventional modern wind turbines attain 23 megawatts nameplate capacity, 4055% capacity factors,  and can generate a kilowatt hour of electricity for $0.020.035.  The inventors found an ideal wind speed of 26 miles per hour. Others have attempted bladeless technology. The Fuller Wind Turbine System was a bladeless wind turbine announced in 2010 by Solatec LLC. Saphon Energy announced a bladeless wind turbine in 2012.

On their website they say product certification has progressed 50% toward completion. 

Vortex Bladeless is attempting to produce a wind turbine that isn't actually a turbine. All generators require a magnetic field, a conductor and motion to produce electricity. A small generator can only produce a small amount of power. It takes a lot of energy (movement) to make a generator turn. The biggest are generally turned by massive amounts of falling water, heat, steam or air. There is very little movement in the Vortex "turbine". All the movement at the top doesn't translate to much down where the generator is. They use a linear generator.

They have recently shown performance tests in Puerto Cortés, Honduras.

References

External links
 
 Technical paper of the technology (white paper).
 Video about this wind turbine development and fabrication.
 Video of the Vortex's turbines working on a wind tunnel.

Engineering companies of Spain
Wind power in Spain
Wind turbine manufacturers